Eurithia is a genus of flies in the family Tachinidae.

Species

E. anthophila (Robineau-Desvoidy, 1830)
E. atra (Brauer, 1898)
E. breviunguis Chao & Shi, 1981
E. caesia (Fallén, 1810)
E. castellana (Strobl, 1906)
E. connivens (Zetterstedt, 1844)
E. consobrina (Meigen, 1824)
E. excellens Zimin, 1957
E. globiventris Chao & Shi, 1981
E. heilongjiana Chao & Shi, 1981
E. hystrix (Zimin, 1957)
E. intermedia (Zetterstedt, 1844)
E. mesnili (Zimin, 1957)
E. nigripennis Chao & Shi, 1981
E. nigronitida Chao & Shi, 1981
E. pilosigena (Zimin, 1957)
E. shanxiensis Chao & Liu, 1998
E. suspecta (Pandellé, 1896)
E. tadzhica (Zimin, 1957)
E. trichocalyptera Chao & Shi, 1981
E. tuberculata Chao & Shi, 1981
E. vivida (Zetterstedt, 1838)

References

Tachininae
Articles containing video clips
Tachinidae genera
Taxa named by Jean-Baptiste Robineau-Desvoidy